Louisa Hareruia Wall (born 17 February 1972) is a former New Zealand Labour Party politician who served as a Member of Parliament (MP) from 2011 to 2022. She has represented New Zealand in both netball as a Silver Fern and rugby union as a member of the Black Ferns. In late March 2022, Wall announced that she would resign from Parliament.

Early and personal life
Born in Taupō, Wall has Ngāti Tūwharetoa, Ngāti Hineuru and Waikato ancestry. She was named after her father's cousin Louis, who died on the day she was born.

She attended secondary school at Taupo-nui-a-Tia College and earned qualifications from the Waikato Institute of Technology and the University of Waikato (Certificate and Diploma in Sport and Recreation) and Massey University (Bachelor of Social Policy and Social Work;  M. Phil (Social Policy)). She worked in the health field.  She is openly lesbian and is a strong advocate for human rights.

Sporting career 
Wall was named in the Silver Ferns 1989 team, aged 17, having been an outstanding athlete and scholar at Taupo-nui-a-Tia College.

Inspired by watching the All Blacks on TV with her father as a child, Wall made the Black Ferns in 1995. This team would go on to win the first ever Women's Rugby World Cup. The team won their first game against Germany 134–6, and the final against the USA 44–12.  In 1997, Wall won the title of New Zealand Women's Rugby Player of the Year.

Wall had been banned from playing at her dad's club as a girl at the age of five. After winning the World Cup in 1998, she returned to New Zealand and gave her medal to her dad.

On 30 November 2019, Wall was inducted into the Maori Sports Hall of Fame.

Political career 

In the  Wall stood unsuccessfully in the  electorate and occupied the 46th position on the Labour list.

Wall became a Labour Party Member of Parliament (MP) on 4 March 2008 to replace retiring list MP Ann Hartley.

Wall returned to Parliament as a Labour List MP after Darren Hughes resigned, as she had been selected in December 2010 to represent Labour in  due to the retirement of George Hawkins. She continued to hold Manurewa by a comfortable margin during both the 2014 and 2017 elections.

Same-sex marriage legislation

In May 2012, Wall submitted a Bill to legalise same-sex marriage in New Zealand to the Member's bill ballot. It was subsequently drawn and introduced to Parliament in late July 2012.

On 29 August 2012, the Marriage (Definition of Marriage) Amendment Bill passed its first reading with a vote of 80–40. On 17 April 2013, the Bill was passed into law by 77 votes to 44, making New Zealand the 13th nation to allow same-sex marriage. The Bill came into effect on 19 August 2013; since then, married same sex couples in New Zealand have been able to adopt children jointly.

At the third reading, Wall gave a speech likening the passing of the Bill to Treaty of Waitangi settlement acts previously passed by the New Zealand Parliament. She stated the passing of the Bill was like winning a "World Cup final".

2020 re-selection dispute
Wall was nominated by the Manurewa Local Electorate Committee for reselection as the Labour candidate for Manurewa at the 2020 general election. Arena Williams and Ian Dunwoodie challenged Wall for the party selection. Dunwoodie had previously run for selection in 2010, but lost to Wall.  Arena Williams, who was mentored by Grant Robertson, submitted her nomination after the advertised deadline.

The selection was scheduled to be held on 21 March 2020, but was delayed due to the late nomination of Arena Williams and a challenge by Ian Dunwoodie to the Local Electorate Committee participation on the Selection Panel. On 9 May 2020 the NZ Council of the Labour Party accepted Arena William's nomination and removed the Local Electorate Committee representation from the Selection Panel.  Wall sought legal advice which she shared with the NZ Council and suggested internal resolution. However the NZ Council rescheduled the selection for 30 May and following discussions with the Party over the legal issues, Wall withdrew her nomination as a candidate for the Manurewa electorate to run as a list only candidate confirmed at number 29. The New Zealand Herald reported that Dunwoodie had secured enough support in the electorate to beat Wall for the nomination and that Williams was brought in by the NZ Council to block him.

During the 2020 general election, Wall was re-elected on the Labour Party list.

Abortion safe zones
Following a voting mix-up which saw the elimination of the safe area provisions of the Abortion Legislation Act 2020, Louisa Wall submitted a private member's bill called the Contraception, Sterilisation, and Abortion (Safe Areas) Amendment Bill, proposing their restoration. The bill was drawn from the ballot on 23 July 2020 prior to the 2020 New Zealand general election in October 2020. The CSA (Safe Areas) Amendment Bill passed its first reading on 10 March 2021 and was subsequently referred to the select committee stage. During the first reading, Walls argued that safe zones were not a free speech issue but was about protecting women's rights to access abortion services. The Bill passed its third reading on 16 March 2022 by a margin of 108 to 12 votes.

Resignation
On 29 March 2022, Wall announced that she would resign from Parliament, citing "events during the 2020 election". Her resignation came into effect on 1 May 2022. Her seat in Parliament was filled by the next person on Labour's list, Lemauga Lydia Sosene.

In April 2022 the Foreign Minister Nanaia Mahuta announced that Wall had been appointed to a newly created position in the Ministry of Foreign Affairs as Ambassador for Gender Equality (Pacific)/Tuia Tāngata. The role will support gender equality and the advancement and leadership opportunities for women and LGBTQI+ people in the Pacific Islands. The position is for two years.

Political views and activism

Controversial Al Nisbet cartoons
In 2013, Wall lodged a complaint with the Human Rights Commission over two cartoons by Al Nisbet published by the-then Fairfax NZ Ltd relating to the extension of the Government's "Breakfast in Schools" programme.  The Human Rights Commission took no action. In May 2017, Wall referred the matter to the Human Rights Review Tribunal which found the cartoons insulting in their depiction of Maori and Pasifika but did not amount to a breach of s.61 of the Human Rights Act 1993. In November 2017, Wall appealed the decision at the High Court. In February 2018, the High Court dismissed Wall's appeal against Fairfax Media. While the High Court did not overturn the Tribunal's decision it found the cartoons were objectively offensive and observed there should be a cause for reflection by Fairfax and their editorial teams. The Court found Wall had raised important issues of public interest and no costs award was made.

Transgender rights
In late June 2021, Wall expressed support for transgender athlete Laurel Hubbard, stating that she has every right to be at the 2020 Summer Olympics and hope that she would do New Zealand well. Wall rejected suggestions that Hubbard transitioned to give her an advantage, emphasising that Hubbard had given up weightlifting for many years after she realised her identity did not match her biology.

China
In June 2020, Wall joined the Inter-Parliamentary Alliance on China alongside National MP Simon O'Connor. The Inter-Parliamentary Alliance on China (IPAC) is an international cross-party group of legislators working towards reform on how democratic countries approach China.  In December 2020, she and O'Connor urged New Zealand to support Australia in the face of diplomatic and trade pressure from China. 

In early July 2021, Wall alleged that China was harvesting organs from Falun Gong and Uyghur political prisoners. She also alleged that China was detaining 1 million Uyghur in "education camps" as slave labour for picking cotton. Wall called on the New Zealand Government to pass legislation to stop the purchase of goods produced through forced labour and to stop New Zealanders getting organ transplants sourced from China or from any country that cannot verify the integrity of its organ donor programme. Wall based her statements on Sir Geoffrey Nice's China Tribunal. In response, Prime Minister Ardern distanced herself from Wall, stating that the latter was not representing the New Zealand Government but as chair of the New Zealand branch of the Inter-Parliamentary Alliance.

Notes

See also

References

External links 
 Parliamentary website page 
 Inter-Parliamentary Alliance on China website
 Labour Party website page
 GayNZ.com's Louisa Wall profile page 

1972 births
Living people
Lesbian sportswomen
New Zealand LGBT sportspeople
LGBT rugby union players
Lesbian politicians
LGBT members of the Parliament of New Zealand
Massey University alumni
New Zealand female rugby union players
New Zealand list MPs
New Zealand Labour Party MPs
New Zealand netball players
Women members of the New Zealand House of Representatives
University of Waikato alumni
Members of the New Zealand House of Representatives
New Zealand MPs for Auckland electorates
People from Taupō
Unsuccessful candidates in the 2008 New Zealand general election
Ngāti Tūwharetoa people
Waikato Tainui people
Unsuccessful candidates in the 2002 New Zealand general election
Unsuccessful candidates in the 2005 New Zealand general election
21st-century New Zealand politicians
21st-century New Zealand women politicians
Candidates in the 2017 New Zealand general election
People educated at Taupo-nui-a-Tia College
LGBT netball players
New Zealand international netball players
Netball players at the 1989 World Games
Candidates in the 2020 New Zealand general election
1991 World Netball Championships players
New Zealand women's international rugby union players
New Zealand Māori netball players
New Zealand Māori rugby union players